María del Pilar Ortega Martínez (born 29 June 1968) is a Mexican politician affiliated with the PAN. She currently serves as Senator of the LXII Legislature of the Mexican Congress taking office on 9 October 2012 after the death of Alonso Lujambio. She also served as Deputy during the LX Legislature.

References

1968 births
Living people
Members of the Senate of the Republic (Mexico)
Members of the Chamber of Deputies (Mexico)
National Action Party (Mexico) politicians
21st-century Mexican politicians
21st-century Mexican women politicians
People from León, Guanajuato
Politicians from Guanajuato
Universidad Iberoamericana alumni
Harvard University alumni
Universidad de Guanajuato alumni
Monterrey Institute of Technology and Higher Education alumni
Women members of the Senate of the Republic (Mexico)
Women members of the Chamber of Deputies (Mexico)